William F Berrier  (born April 21, 1938, in Harrisburg, Pennsylvania) was a baseball manager in the Los Angeles Dodgers minor league system for 10 years from 1966-1976. His career managerial record was 1,023-496, a winning percentage of .675. He won the Northwest League championship with the Rogue Valley Dodgers in 1969. Prior to his extensive managerial career, he played in the Dodgers farm system from 1960-1967. After leaving the Dodgers organization, Berrier was the head coach and athletic director at Juniata College until he retired in 2007.

Teams managed
Jamestown Dodgers (1966)
Dubuque Packers (1967)
Daytona Beach Dodgers (1968)
Rogue Valley Dodgers (1969)
Medford Dodgers (1970-1971)
Spokane Indians (1972)
Bellingham Dodgers (1973-1976)

External links

Minor league baseball managers
Living people
1938 births
Panama City Fliers players
Greenville Spinners players
Albuquerque Dukes players
Jamestown Dodgers players
Albuquerque Dodgers players
Dubuque Packers players
Spokane Indians managers